Patrick Alexander may refer to:

Patrick Young Alexander (1867–1943), British aeronautical pioneer
Patrick Alexander (writer) (1926–1997/2003), British novelist, thriller writer, journalist and screenwriter
Patrick Alexander (poet) (1940–2005), Irish poet
Patrick Alexander (cartoonist), Australian cartoonist